Château-Richer is a small town situated in the Capitale-Nationale region of Quebec, Canada. Located on the north shore of the Saint Lawrence River east of Quebec City, Château-Richer is the seat for the Côte-de-Beaupré Regional County Municipality.

The first rural parish in New France was established there in 1678 and many of the oldest families in Quebec first settled there. Even today, a fairly large segment of the town's population can be traced back to those pioneering families.

The town stretches for several miles alongside Route 138. This road, which was originally known as the King's Road (Chemin du Roy, or Chemin royal), to be later renamed Avenue royale, is among the first ones to be built in North America.

History
In 1626, Samuel de Champlain established in Château-Richer the first farm in the Saint Lawrence valley, to feed the people of Quebec city. Jean Bourdon's map of 1641 is the earliest source that mentions the name "Chateau Richer", referring only to the cape or headland on which stands the present church. But the origin of this name remains uncertain. In 1646, Olivier Letardif, Lord and Chief Prosecutor, granted 20 concessions to the inhabitants of Château-Richer so that they could officially establish themselves properly.

In 1678, the local parish was formed, named La Visitation-de-Notre-Dame. On March 15, 1753, Château-Richer became very first organized village in New France. In 1832, the post office opened. In 1845, the municipality was first established but abolished in 1847. It was reestablished in 1855 when it was incorporated as a parish municipality. Château-Richer was the county town of defunct Montmorency County.

Louis-Théodore Besserer, a prominent businessman of Ottawa, was born in Château-Richer.

In 1968, it changed its status and became Ville de Château-Richer with the status of a town.

Demographics

Mother tongue:
 English as first language: 0.6%
 French as first language: 97.7%
 English and French as first language: 0.4%
 Other as first language: 1.3%

List of mayors
Successive mayors of Château-Richer:

 Lemoine, H. : 1845 - 1848
 Huot, Michel : 1849 - 1851
 Renaud, Jean : 1852 - 1854
 Rheaume, Charles : 1855 - 1857
 Bernier, L.P. : 1858 - 1859
 Gravel, Alexandre : 1860 - 1871
 Cloutier, Vincent : 1872 - 1873
 Tremblay, Onésime : 1874 - 1875
 Cauchon, Pierre : 1876 - 1876
 Cloutier, Edouard : 1877 - 1885
 Gravel, Louis-Nérée : 1886 - 1887
 Premont, Joseph : 1888 - 1888
 Cloutier, Joseph. P. : 1889 - 1890
 Gariepy, Edouard : 1890 - 1891
 Simard, Etienne Romain : 1891 - 1891
 Cote, François : 1882 - 1892
 Laplante, François Xavier : 1883 - 1895
 Cloutier, Nazaire : 1896 - 1899
 Dick, Herménégilde : 1900 - 1900
 Lefrancois, Amédée : 1901 - 1901

 Jobidon, Julien : 1902 - 1902
 Cloutier, Joseph : 1903 - 1916
 Cloutier, Emile : 1917 - 1920
 Cloutier, Joseph : 1921 - 1924
 Lefrancois, Jules A. : 1925 - 1931
 Jobidon, Hilaire : 1931 - 1933
 Gravel, Edouard Lazare : 1933 - 1935
 Jobidon, Pierre : 1935 - 1937
 Cauchon, Léonidas : 1937 - 1939
 Rheaume, Lucien : 1939 - 1959
 Gagnon, Philippe : 1959 - 1965
 Laplante, Omer : 1965 - 1967
 Bolduc, Jean-Guy : 1967 - 1973
 Premont, Paul-Emile : 1973 - 1977
 Bolduc, Jean-Guy : 1977 - 1978
 Verreault, Noël : 1978 - 1985
 Laplante, Léo : 1985 - 1993
 Cloutier, Jean-Guy : 1993–2005
 Dancause, Frédéric : 2005 - 2017
 Robitaille, Jean : 2017 - 2021
 Pouliot, Gino  : 2021 -

See also
 Chenal de l'Île d'Orléans
 Saint-Adolphe River North-East
 Rivière du Petit Pré
 Cazeau River
 Rivière du Sault à la Puce
 Rivière aux Chiens (Côte-de-Beaupré)
 Rivière la Retenue
 Centre d'Interprétation de la Côte-de-Beaupré
 List of cities in Quebec

References

External links

Cities and towns in Quebec
Incorporated places in Capitale-Nationale